Carlos Morales Troncoso (29 September 1940 – 25 October 2014) was Vice President of the Dominican Republic from 1986 to 1994 and its foreign minister from 2004 to 2014.

Family background
Carlos Morales Troncoso’s grandfather, Manuel de Jesús Troncoso de la Concha, was figurehead president under dictator Rafael Trujillo from 1940 to 1942. Carlos Morales Troncoso studied in Puerto Rico until his family moved to New Orleans, where his father, Avelino Eduardo Morales, was named General Consul and where Carlos continued his studies.

Career
Morales Troncoso graduated in sugar and chemical engineering at Louisiana State University and worked at the South Puerto Rico Sugar Corporation's Romana sugar factory, becoming head of the Gulf + Western owned company at the age of 32.

He entered politics when President Joaquin Balaguer asked him to be his vice-president for the PRSC ticket at the 1986 presidential elections. He served as vice-president from 1986-1994.  He was also head of the State Sugar Council, ambassador to the United States and foreign minister.

Personal life
He was married to Luisa Alba de Morales with whom he has 4 daughters, Ivette Morales de Baittiner, Nicole Morales de Bogaert, Michele Morales de Franco and Cecile Morales de Vitienes.  

He died in Houston, Texas on 25 October 2014 from leukemia, aged 74.

Political career
Troncoso was a leader of the Presidential Reformist Counsel until its dissolution on 12 December 2008 and member of the Dominican monetary board before becoming vice-president in 1986.  He was ambassador to the US from 1989 to 1990 and foreign minister from 1994 to 1996 and from 2004 until his death.

He and the members of the Presidential Reformist Counsel returned to the Social Christian Reformist Party on 12 December 2008.

Awards
 In 1982, he was named "Businessman of the year" by Asociación Interamericana de Hombres de Empresa, Inc.
 In 1982 he was named "man of the year" by the Dominican Chamber of Commerce of New York .
 He was named most distinguished graduate of the year in 1992 by Louisiana State University.
 In his home country, Troncoso has received the Order of Merit of Duarte, Sánchez and Mella and the Order of Christopher Columbus.

Morales has received decorations from the governments of Taiwan, Italy, and Costa Rica
He was decorated with:
 In Spain the Sovereign Military Order of Malta and the San Carlos Order.
 In Peru the Order of the Great Cross
 In Panama with the Vasco Núñez de Balboa Order
 In Honduras the José Cecilio del Valle Order
 In Chile the Order of Excellence

Furthermore he has received the follow awards:
 Doctor Honoris Causa – Technological University of Santiago (UTESA) (1979)
 Distinguished Graduate in the Business World Louisiana State University (1981)
 Free Enterprise Award – Best Cluster Company Gulf & Western Industries, Inc. (1982)
 Doctor Honoris Causa of Humanities Chicago State University (1987)
 Julián Barceló Award as Sports Promoter Asociación de Cronistas Deportivos & Barceló & Cia. (1989)

Books
Troncoso wrote several books, including "De lo Privado a lo Público" about his work in the public and private sectors.

References

|-

1940 births
2014 deaths
Place of birth missing
Social Christian Reformist Party politicians
Morales Troncoso, Carlos
Ambassadors of the Dominican Republic to the United States
Foreign ministers of the Dominican Republic
Recipients of the Order of Christopher Columbus
Order of Merit of Duarte, Sánchez and Mella
Dominican Republic people of Portuguese descent
Dominican Republic people of Spanish descent
Deaths from cancer in the Dominican Republic
Deaths from leukemia
Presidents of political parties in the Dominican Republic
People named in the Pandora Papers
White Dominicans
20th-century Dominican Republic politicians
21st-century Dominican Republic politicians